Rockoff is a German surname. Notable people with the surname include: 

Al Rockoff (born 1946), American photojournalist
Dylan Rockoff (born 1994), American singer-songwriter
Jonah Rockoff, American education economist

See also
Rakoff

German-language surnames